Dinham may refer to:

Places

England
a historic settlement that forms part of the town of Ludlow, Shropshire

Wales
a village in Monmouthshire that was consumed by the Royal Navy Propellant Factory, Caerwent